Shillong College, established in 1956, is a general degree college situated in Shillong, Meghalaya. This college is affiliated with the North Eastern Hill University.

Departments

Science
Physics
Mathematics
Chemistry
Statistics
Botany
Zoology
Microbiology
Computer Science and Application
Environmental Science

Arts and Commerce
Language
English
History
Education
Economics
Philosophy
Sociology
Political Science
Commerce
Management

References

External links

Universities and colleges in Meghalaya
Colleges affiliated to North-Eastern Hill University
Educational institutions established in 1956
1956 establishments in Assam